The Battle of Rappahannock River was fought in 1813 during the War of 1812. A British force blockading the Rappahannock River of Virginia sent several hundred men in boats to attack four American privateers. Ultimately the British were victorious and the American ships were captured.

Background
They held several American prizes and were out to capture more so the British commanders prepared a cutting out expedition, where small boats attempt to capture larger vessels at anchor. On the following day, the British dispatched seventeen, pinnaces, barges, launches, and other boats with a few carronades to sail around the bay. Each boat carried up to fifty marines or sailors mainly armed with steel, Lieutenant James Polkinghorne was in command. While abreast of Windmill Point at about 4:00 pm, the expedition sighted five American vessels and chased them all through the night  until losing sight as they passed a turn in the river. The British had difficulty in rowing up the Rappahannock so during the descent twelve of the boats fell far behind leaving only five British craft, one 12-pounder and 105 officers and men to make the attack.

Four of the pursued ships were armed schooners under Captain William S. Stafford in the twelve gun . The others were Lynx of six guns, Racer of six guns and Arab of seven guns. In all, the American schooners mounted 30 guns with 160 men. Most or all of these vessels were built in Baltimore. Captain Stafford had little alternative but to scuttle the schooners or fight. He decided to offer resistance and anchored his ships in line of battle with portside guns facing the mouth of the Rappahannock where the British would originate.

Battle

The largest of the American ships was Arab of over 380 tons but with a crew of only forty-five men, she was sternmost in line and was considered to be the most "war like" of the four. Dolphin of 300 tons was headmost and she was Captain Stafford's flagship, carrying ninety-eight men into battle. When the British came within sight of the American line, they first stopped to wait for the wind and the remaining twelve boats to come up so Polkinghorne took the time to rally his men. After a few more minutes the wind was still calm so the lieutenant ordered an attack in order to deny the Americans time to prepare defenses or escape. Polkinghorne sent a boat with the 12-pounder forward to commence an artillery duel with the intention of delaying the Americans but this failed when Stafford's ships all opened fire with a combined broadside. Lieutenant Polkinghorne decided to stop waiting at this point and he led his boats directly for the center two American ships, Racer and Lynx, each of 280 tons and with crews totaling seventy-six men. As the British closed range the Americans fired another broadside so Polkinghorne had his men alter course and head for Arab. When the British boats drew near there were three left, two having been hit and sunk by American fire.

The remaining Britons boarded while shouting various phrases, Arab tacked to try to bring her starboard guns into battle but she was boarded before achieving this and so her commander ran her aground on the riverbank. Racer and Lynx were quickly taken, their crews surrendered as the British climbed on deck, others jumped over the side and escaped capture. When Polkinghorne went for Dolphin, Captain Stafford put up a stubborn fight and it reportedly took fifteen minutes to secure the vessel. Five Americans were wounded before Dolphin struck her colors and ended the battle, though casualties from the other privateers amounted to six killed and five more wounded. By the time the fighting was over the remaining British boats arrived and assisted in taking over 100 prisoners.

Aftermath
Polkinghorne reported that only two of his men were killed and eleven wounded, including himself. American newspaper reports in Niles Register at first claimed that fifty Britons had been killed, later reducing that claim to nineteen dead. A review by British and American historians later put the British losses at two dead and eleven wounded with American losses as sixteen killed and wounded. The battle lasted in between fifteen minutes and two hours according to various accounts. Captain Stafford later returned to Baltimore. He was treated well in captivity partly due to his good treatment towards British prisoners from his captured prizes. A replica of Lynx now spends its time on an educational mission sailing back and forth between the Great Lakes and Florida's Gulf Coast. It was difficult for the British to free Arab and though they eventually succeeded, the vessel was apparently badly damaged and was not commissioned for British service.

See also
 Battle of Lake Borgne

References

 
 
 

Rappahannock River
Rappahannock River
Rappahannock River
1813 in Virginia
Rappahannock River
April 1813 events